The following events occurred in January 1985:

January 1, 1985 (Tuesday)
The Internet's Domain Name System is established.
Greenland withdraws from the European Economic Community as a result of an agreement.
Vodafone launches the UK's first mobile phone network.
VH-1, a new music video channel, begins broadcasting on American cable television, aimed at an older demographic than its sister station, MTV. The first video played is Marvin Gaye's "The Star-Spangled Banner".
The lost remains of the plane and those on board are not found for a further 31 years.
The city of Cork, in Ireland, begins a year of celebrations marking the 800th anniversary of its charter, received from John, King of England.
The 1985 Fiesta Bowl college football game is held at Tempe, Arizona, United States, and is won by the UCLA Bruins.
The 1985 World Junior Ice Hockey Championships conclude in Finland, with Canada in first place.
Dan Marino of the Miami Dolphins was named The Sporting News NFL Player of the year, and Louis Lipps of the Pittsburgh Steelers who led the NFL in punt returns was named NFL Rookie of the Year.
Died: Sigerson Clifford, 71, Irish poet, playwright, and civil servant

January 2, 1985 (Wednesday)
Died: Gabriel Elorde, 49, Filipino world super featherweight boxing champion, of lung cancer.

January 3, 1985 (Thursday)
The 99th United States Congress is opened.
US Senator Bob Dole becomes the Republican Leader of the United States Senate and Senate Majority Leader in succession to Howard Baker.

January 4, 1985 (Friday)
Ad Rutschman, head football coach of Linfield College (Oregon), has been named NAIA Division II Football coach of the year for the second time in three seasons.
Born: Gökhan Gönül, Turkish footballer, in Bafra

January 5, 1985 (Saturday)
Israeli Prime Minister Shimon Peres reveals details of Operation Moses in a press conference, resulting in its termination by the Government of Sudan. In seven weeks of operation, the covert, cooperative operation by the Israel Defense Forces, the Central Intelligence Agency, the United States Embassy in Khartoum, mercenaries, and Sudanese state security forces had evacuated about 8,000 Jewish refugees from Sudan to Israel via Brussels, Belgium.
At ceremonies held in Nenana and Seward, Alaska, ownership of the Alaska Railroad is officially transferred to the U.S. state of Alaska.
The Asian Basketball Confederation Championship concludes in Kuala Lumpur, Malaysia, with the Philippines emerging overall champions.
Princess Margaret is being treated at Brompton Hospital in London, where part of her left lung will be surgically removed.
Died: Robert Surtees, 78, US Academy Award-winning cinematographer

January 6, 1985 (Sunday)
The 1984–85 Four Hills Tournament, held at the four traditional venues of Oberstdorf, Garmisch-Partenkirchen, Innsbruck and Bischofshofen, concludes with an overall win for German ski jumper Jens Weißflog.
Ardea, a US-registered  fishing vessel, drags her anchor and is wrecked in King Cove off the coast of Afognak Island in Alaska′s Kodiak Archipelago. Her crew are saved.

January 7, 1985 (Monday)
Film star Yul Brynner, suffering from terminal lung cancer, appears on the US television programme Good Morning America, and vows to make a public service announcement to deter others from smoking.
Born: Lewis Hamilton, English racing driver, 7 times Formula One world champion, in Stevenage; Wayne Routledge, English footballer, in Sidcup, Greater London

January 8, 1985 (Tuesday)

The Japan Aerospace Exploration Agency launches Sakigake, Japan's first interplanetary spacecraft. It is the first deep space probe to be launched by any country other than the United States or Soviet Union.
Mary Lou Retton, American gymnast who won the hearts of the US at the 1984 Summer Olympics, is named The Associated Press Female Athlete of the Year.
Died: Grace Morley, 84, US museologist

January 9, 1985 (Wednesday)
France passes a law relating to the protection and development of mountain regions.
46-year-old Richard Peña of Granada Hills, California, falls  to his death after climbing over the guardrail at the First Trailview Overlook on West Rim Drive in Grand Canyon National Park. Peña's final words are, "You gotta take some chances in life."
The Ministers for Foreign Affairs of the Contadora Group of countries issue a joint declaration noting the decisions and achievements of their conference.

January 10, 1985 (Thursday)
British inventor Sir Clive Sinclair introduces the Sinclair C5, the world's first mass-produced velomobile. Critics consider it unsafe and impractical, and it proves a commercial failure.
Madhav Singh Solanki, Chief Minister of the Indian state of Gujarat, introduces an increase of 18% in the proportion of government positions reserved for people from "backward" classes. The change indirectly leads to rioting the following month and Solanki's eventual resignation.
The 1985 PGA Tour golf championship opens with the Bob Hope Classic.
Dan Marino of the Miami Dolphins who in the 1984 NFL Season shattered many NFL Passing season records was named the Bert Bell Award as the NFL's Outstanding player of 1984.
John McEnroe was voted Volvo Grand Prix Tennis player of the year by tennis journalists.
The town of Karlskoga was covered in a sulfuric acid gas following a gas leak.
Died: Anton Karas, 78, Austrian zither player and composer

January 11, 1985 (Friday)
One of the biggest music festivals ever held, "Rock in Rio", begins in Rio de Janeiro, Brazil. The audience for the ten-day event is estimated at 1.5 million, with performers including Iron Maiden, Nina Hagen, The B52's, Go Go's, Queen, Rod Stewart, James Taylor, AC/DC, Gilberto Gil, Elba Ramalho, Barão Vermelho and Paralamas do Sucesso.
Died: Sir William McKell, 93, Australian politician, 12th Governor-General of Australia

January 12, 1985 (Saturday)
The Embassy World Darts Championship, held at the Jollees Cabaret Club in Stoke-on-Trent, England, is won by Eric Bristow, his fifth world title.

January 13, 1985 (Sunday)
Awash rail disaster: Africa's worst ever rail disaster occurs when a passenger train falls into a ravine in Ethiopia, killing 428 people and injuring over 500 others.
The 1985 Mercantile Credit Classic snooker tournament is won by Willie Thorne, and would be his only ranking title.

January 14, 1985 (Monday)
Hun Sen, acting prime minister of Cambodia since the death of his predecessor Chan Sy, is confirmed in the office.
The US  fishing vessel K-Jo sinks off Marmot Island in Alaska′s Kodiak Archipelago, with the loss of one of the three crew. The two survivors are rescued two days later.

January 15, 1985 (Tuesday)
Tancredo Neves is elected president of Brazil by the Congress, ending the 21-year military rule. It is the last election to be held under the electoral college system.
A car bomb, planted by the Belgian terrorist organization Cellules Communistes Combattantes, goes off outside a NATO building near Brussels, resulting in the deaths of two firemen and injuries to others, including a US serviceman.
Mike Castle is inaugurated as the Governor of the US state of Delaware, in succession to his mentor, Pete du Pont.
An HH-53 helicopter of the 6594th Test Group of the United States Air Force crashes while attempting a rescue a British merchant seaman from the ship "Asian Beauty", off the coast of Hawaii. All seven crew members are killed after a main rotor blade broke while the helicopter hovered over the ship.
Raafat H was born in Kfarbou, Syria around 4 am (according to his mother). Raafat is a Syrian Tech entrepreneur, Data scientist and engineer as well as an educator.

January 16, 1985 (Wednesday)
In Burlington, Vermont, United States, William J. Murray announces that he will contest the impending mayoral election as a "Libertarian", against incumbent mayor Bernie Sanders.

January 17, 1985 (Thursday)
The Israeli government establishes the Bejski Commission to investigate the 1983 Israel bank stock crisis.
Cyclone Eric makes landfall in Fiji, causing wind damage and extensive flooding. About 30,000 persons are made homeless. Eric brought $40 million (USD) in damage and took 25 lives.
A heavy snowfall causes the roof of the Palasport di San Siro arena in Milan, Italy, to collapse, forcing the venue to close permanently.
The UK-registered cargo ship Byron I, en route from Poland to India, is wrecked at Kalilimenes, Crete, Greece.

January 18, 1985 (Friday)
A Chinese Antonov An-24 turbo-prop airliner flying from Shanghai to Beijing via Nanjing crashes during an emergency landing at Jinan, China, south of Beijing. Only three of the 41 people on board survive.
The 1985 IAAF World Indoor Games open in Paris, France, with 319 athletes from 69 countries participating.
Died: Anwar Shemza, 56, Indian-born artist and writer

January 19, 1985 (Saturday)
A spell of particularly cold weather begins to affect the north-central United States.
The submarine USS Augusta (SSN-710) is commissioned into the United States Navy.
Died: Eric Voegelin, 84, German-born American political philosopher

January 20, 1985 (Sunday)
Ronald Reagan is privately sworn in for a second term as President of the United States. The ceremony is moved indoors because of the unusually cold weather.
São Paulo–Guarulhos International Airport begins operations in São Paulo, Brazil.
In the final game of the Super Bowl XIX American football championship, the first to be televised in the United States by ABC as well as other major channels, the San Francisco 49ers defeat the Miami Dolphins 38–16 to win their second Super Bowl.
The city of Chicago in the United States experiences record low temperatures of -27 degrees Fahrenheit.

January 21, 1985 (Monday)

Nine bombs explode at the Borobudur Buddhist temple in Magelang, Central Java, Indonesia, damaging nine historic stupas. No one is killed.
Galaxy Airlines Flight 203, a Lockheed L-188 Electra carrying 71 people, crashes immediately after takeoff from Reno-Cannon International Airport in Reno, Nevada, United States. The sole survivor is a 17-year-old boy who is thrown clear of the aircraft, landing in a city street still strapped into his seat.
The crew are rescued by another South Korean ship.
The south-eastern United States experiences unprecedentedly low temperatures, with record lows in places such as Nashville, Tennessee, Birmingham, Alabama and Charleston, South Carolina.

January 22, 1985 (Tuesday)
The Japanese diesel-electric Yūshio-class submarine JDS Akishio is launched in Kobe.
Inducted into the Pro Football Hall of Fame: Quarterback Joe Namath of the New York Jets, quarterback Roger Staubach of the Dallas Cowboys, running back O. J. Simpson of the Buffalo Bills, center Frank Gatski of the Cleveland Browns and NFL Commissioner Pete Rozelle.

January 23, 1985 (Wednesday)
A debate in the British House of Lords is televised, as an experiment by the UK government in the televising of Parliament. Former Prime Minister Harold Macmillan (1st Earl of Stockton), is among the speakers.

January 24, 1985 (Thursday)
Space Shuttle program: The space shuttle Discovery, on its third flight, is successfully launched from Kennedy LC-39A in Florida, USA, carrying five astronauts and two satellites.

January 25, 1985 (Friday)
Born: Tina Karol, Ukrainian singer, in Orotukan, USSR

January 26, 1985 (Saturday)
A few minutes after midnight, a 6.2 magnitude earthquake hits the province of Mendoza, Argentina. Six people are killed and about 100 injured, with about 23,000 homes destroyed.
The 1985 Australia Day Honours are announced by the Governor General of Australia, Sir Ninian Stephen. Those honoured include painter Lloyd Rees and lawyer Mahla Pearlman.
Frank Miller is elected leader of the Ontario Progressive Conservative Party at the party convention, replacing Bill Davis. The following month Miller would become Premier of the Canadian province of Ontario.
Died:
 Kenny Clarke (nicknamed Klook), 71, American jazz drummer and bandleader
 David Ormsby-Gore, 5th Baron Harlech, 66, British politician, diplomat and TV executive, of injuries received in a car crash the previous evening

January 27, 1985 (Sunday)
Space Shuttle program: The space shuttle Discovery successfully lands after its third flight.
The 1984 New York Film Critics Circle Awards ceremony takes place in New York City, United States.
Asia's Economic Cooperation Organization (ECO) is re-established, in Tehran.
The 59th Railway Cup Hurling Championship opens with semi-final matches at St. Brendan's Park, Birr, Ireland, and St. Patrick's Park, Newcastle, Ireland.
Died: Eric Radford, Canadian skater, in Winnipeg

January 28, 1985 (Monday)
Various US and European musicians, under the group name "USA For Africa", meet in Los Angeles to record the song "We Are the World", written by Michael Jackson and Lionel Richie, with the aim of raising money for victims of the Ethiopian famine, a cause brought to the world's attention by Irish musician Bob Geldof. Performers include Ray Charles, Bob Dylan, Billy Joel, Cyndi Lauper, Steve Perry, Kenny Loggins, Willie Nelson, Smokey Robinson, Kenny Rogers, Diana Ross, Paul Simon, Bruce Springsteen, Huey Lewis, Tina Turner, Sheila E., Harry Belafonte, Lindsey Buckingham, Kim Carnes, Dionne Warwick, Waylon Jennings and Stevie Wonder.
The 12th annual American Music Awards ceremony takes place. Multiple winners include Lionel Richie, Cyndi Lauper, Tina Turner and Prince.
In Nagano, Japan, twenty-five people are killed when a charter bus carrying students on a ski tour plunges into a river.
Born: J. Cole, American hip-hop musician and record producer, in Frankfurt, West Germany

January 29, 1985 (Tuesday)
The Federal Cabinet of Australia secretly endorses the decision to provide refuelling facilities to United States aircraft monitoring MX missile tests in the Pacific. Strong anti-American and anti-nuclear reactions later force Prime Minister Bob Hawke to withdraw the offer.

January 30, 1985 (Wednesday)
Margaret D. Tutwiler is nominated by US President Ronald Reagan as an Assistant Secretary of the Treasury.

January 31, 1985 (Thursday)
During a parliamentary debate, P. W. Botha, President of South Africa, offers to release African National Congress deputy leader Nelson Mandela from prison if Mandela renounces violence.
The FIS Alpine World Ski Championships 1985 open in Bormio, Italy (continuing until February 10).
Born: Kalomira, Greek singer, in West Hempstead, New York, United States, as Carol Sarantis
Died: Tatsuzō Ishikawa, 79, Japanese novelist, first winner of the Akutagawa Prize

References

1985
1985-01
1985-01